The following highways are numbered 777:

Australia
  McMahons Road

Canada

United States